Tirumalayapalem is a mandal in Khammam district of Telangana, India.

Demographics
According to the 2001 Indian census, the population was as follows:
 Total Population: 	60,568	in 14,299 Households. 	
 Male Population: 	30,769	and Female Population: 	29,799		
 Children Under 6-years of age: 8,218	(Boys - 4,211 and Girls - 4,007)
 Total Literates: 	24,783

Villages
The villages in Thirumalayapalem mandal are:
Bachodu
Bachodu Thanda
Beerolu
Chandru Thanda
Dammaigudem
Edullacheruvu
Erragadd
Gol Thanda
Gopala puram
Hasnabad
Hydersaipet
Islavath Thanda
Jaganadhapuram
Jallepalli
jupeda
Kakarva
Kokkiren
Kukalatanda
Medidapalli
Mekalatanda
Mohammadapuram
Mulamarithanda
Painampalli
Patharlapadu
Pindiprolu
Raghunadhapalem
Rajaram
Solipuram
Subledu
Suddavagu thanda
Thalla Cheruvu
Thettalapadu
Thirumalayapalem 
Tippareddigudem (formerly Ramachandrapuram), Thimmakkapeta

References

Mandals in Khammam district